Moncheca is a South American genus of coneheads in the tribe Copiphorini.

Description and distribution 
Members of Moncheca are aposematically colored and one of the few katydid genera to use chemical defenses against predators.

Species
Members of this genus are found in humid tropical forests in Mexico, Central and South America and include:
 Moncheca bisulca (Saint-Fargeau & Serville, 1825)
 Moncheca elegans (Giglio-Tos, 1898)
 Moncheca hyalinata (Haan, 1842)
 Moncheca pretiosa Walker, 1869 - type species
 Moncheca spinifrons (Saussure & Pictet, 1898)

References

Conocephalinae
Orthoptera genera
Orthoptera of South America